Peter Criss is the first solo studio album by Peter Criss, the drummer of American hard rock band Kiss. It was one of four solo albums released by the members of Kiss on September 18, 1978. The album was produced by Vini Poncia, who went on to produce the Kiss albums Dynasty (1979) and Unmasked (1980). Criss covered "Tossin' and Turnin'", which was a No. 1 hit for Bobby Lewis in the U.S. during the summer of 1961. The song was subsequently covered by Kiss on their 1979 tour.

Songs
Much of the material on the album was originally written in 1971 for Criss's pre-Kiss band Lips. These include "I’m Gonna Love You", "Don't You Let Me Down", "That's the Kind of Sugar Papa Likes", and "Hooked on Rock 'n' Roll". The album also includes a cover of the song "Tossin' and Turnin'" by Bobby Lewis.

Reception

Reviews for Peter Criss were mostly negative. AllMusic called it "the most undistinguished of the bunch, lacking hooks on either the pop-metal rockers or the power ballads, as well as personality throughout." The album was the lowest charting of all the Kiss solo albums of 1978, reaching No. 43 on the US Billboard album chart. Of the four solo albums, Peter Criss was the only album to have two singles released from it: "Don't You Let Me Down" and "You Matter to Me", neither of which charted.

Track listing
All credits adapted from the original release.
All songs were written by Peter Criss and Stan Penridge, except where noted.

Cover versions
Harvey Milk covered "Easy Thing" for their compilation album The Singles.
Awaken covered "I'm Gonna Love You" on their double album Party In Lyceum's Toilets.
The Slam covered "Hooked on Rock 'n Roll" on their album Hit It!.

Personnel
 Peter Criss – lead vocals, drums on all songs except tracks 6–7, and 10, percussion on track 8, backing vocals

Additional personnel
 Allan Schwartzberg – drums on tracks 6-7 and 10 
 Bill Bodine – bass guitar on tracks 1-5 and 9
 Neil Jason – bass guitar on tracks 6-7 and 10 
 Art Munson – guitars on  tracks 1-5 and 9
 Stan Penridge – guitars on 1-5 and 8–9, backing vocals
 Elliot Randall – guitars on "Easy Thing" and "I Can't Stop the Rain"
 John Tropea – guitars on tracks 6-7 and 10 
 Brendan Harkin – guitars on "Easy Thing"
 Steve Lukather – guitar solo on "That's the Kind of Sugar Papa Likes" and "Hooked on Rock and Roll"
 Bill Cuomo – keyboards 1-5 and 9
 Richard Gerstein – keyboards on tracks 6–7, and 10
 Davey Faragher, Tommy Faragher, Danny Faragher, Jimmy Faragher, Maxine Dixon, Maxine Willard, Julia Tillman, Vini Poncia, Annie Sutton, Gordon Grody – backing vocals
 Tom Saviano – Horns arranged
 Michael Carnahan – saxophone solo on "Tossin' and Turnin'", baritone sax on "Hooked on Rock 'n' Roll"
 Lenny Castro – percussion on "Tossin' and Turnin'" and "Don't You Let Me Down"

Production
 Mike D. Stone – engineer at the Record Plant, New York City
 Eraldo Carugati – album artwork

Charts

Certification

Release history
Casablanca NBLP-7122 (September 18, 1978): 1st LP issue (with poster)
Casablanca NBPIX-7122 (September 18, 1978): US picture disc
Casablanca 826 917-2 (1988): US 1st CD release.
Mercury 314 532 386-2 (September 16, 1997): Remastered CD (with poster)
Universal Music B0020537-01 (2014): Remastered LP (with poster)

References

External links
 
 Kiss FAQ – Peter Criss, Accessed on July 13, 2005.
 KISSONLINE.COM Discoography- Peter Criss, Accessed on July 28, 2008.
 The KISSFAQ- RIAA Certifications, Accessed on July 28, 2008

1978 debut albums
Albums produced by Vini Poncia
Albums recorded at Electric Lady Studios
Albums recorded at Sunset Sound Recorders
Casablanca Records albums
Peter Criss albums